"I Believe" is a single by the American alternative rock band Blessid Union of Souls from their 1995 debut album, Home. It is one of their most popular songs, and their highest-charting in the United States, reaching number eight on the Billboard Hot 100.

Vocalist Eliot Sloan wrote the song after the father of his girlfriend "Lisa" forced her to stop dating Sloan because of his race.

History
According to the "I Believe Story" from Blessid Union of Souls's compilation album Almost Acoustic (Volume 1), the song was written by vocalist Eliot Sloan in the early morning when he imagined the main piano sample which would be used in the song and then played it.

Eliot Sloan stated in an interview with The Celebrity Cafe that he wrote the song about his relationship with "Lisa", a girl he once dated. Lisa's father allegedly threatened to cut off her college tuition if she continued to see Eliot. They said good-bye and went their separate ways. He said that he still very much missed her, and placed a message in the liner notes of Home: "Lisa, give me a call sometime just to say hello, my number is still the same."

In the 2001 compilation album, Blessid Union of Souls: The Singles, the song was re-recorded in a punk-reggae style.

Lyrics
In an interview with thecelebritycafe.com, Eliot Sloan said "when I sing 'Love will find a way,' I mean 'God will find a way,'" and that he has always believed that "God is love". While the song uses fairly subtle Christian themes, as do many of the band's songs, they tried to make it not sound too preachy.

On the edited version for radio, the word "nigger" in the third verse is replaced with "brother".

Music video
The music video, directed by Michael Salomon, shows the band members singing the song, interspersed with footage representing the ideas of the song.

Critical reception
In a review of Home by AllMusic, staff writer Tom Demalon said that the song "revealed the band to have more of a social conscience than similar acts such as Hootie & the Blowfish through the spiritually tinged lyrics." In a review by Rolling Stone, staff writer Paul Evans called the song "all righteous, wide-eyed affirmation".

In 2003, the song was featured as the ending theme for the Cold Case episode "Hitchhiker".

Track listing
UK CD single
 "I Believe" (Radio Mix) – 3:45
 "Heaven" – 4:33
 "I Believe" (Original Version) – 3:45
 "I Believe" (Blessid Q Mix) – 4:02

US Cassette single

Side A
 "I Believe" (Original Mix) – 4:37

Side B
 "I Believe" (Album Mix) – 4:17
 "Heaven" – 4:33

Charts

Weekly charts

Year-end charts

References

External links
 The music video hosted on YouTube.

1995 singles
Blessid Union of Souls songs
EMI Records singles
Music videos directed by Michael Salomon
Songs against racism and xenophobia